"Lift Me Up" is a song recorded by Barbadian singer Rihanna. It was released on October 28, 2022, by Westbury Road, Roc Nation, Def Jam, and Hollywood Records, as the lead single from the soundtrack album of the 2022 superhero film Black Panther: Wakanda Forever. The song marks Rihanna's first solo music output since her 2016 studio album, Anti. An R&B ballad, "Lift Me Up" was written and produced by Ludwig Göransson, with additional writing from Rihanna, Ryan Coogler, and Nigerian singer Tems.

Music critics were divided on the song; some praised Rihanna's vocals but others labeled the song's lyrics and the production generic. It received various film awards nominations, including Best Original Song at the 95th Academy Awards and Best Original Song at the 80th Golden Globe Awards. The song has also won 4 awards so far, including Best Original Song in a Feature Film at the 13th Hollywood Music in Media Awards and Best Song at the 2023 African-American Film Critics Association.

"Lift Me Up" reached number one in Belgium, Hungary, Switzerland, and South Africa, number two on the US Billboard Hot 100 chart, top five in Australia, the United Kingdom, France and the top ten in various other countries. It was certified platinum by Music Canada, gold by the Syndicat National de l'Édition Phonographique (SNEP) and silver by the British Phonographic Industry (BPI). American cinematographer Autumn Durald Arkapaw directed the music video, which sees Rihanna on an empty beach interspersed with short scenes from the film. Rihanna performed "Lift Me Up" for the first time at the 95th Academy Awards.

Background 
In 2017, Rihanna took an extended hiatus from music after the release of her eighth studio album Anti (2016) and several collaborations, including "Wild Thoughts" with DJ Khaled, "Lemon" with N.E.R.D., "Loyalty" with Kendrick Lamar, and her latest collaboration, "Believe It", with PartyNextDoor. Following the birth of the singer's first child on May 13, 2022, Rihanna said she was working on new record material.

On October 18, 2022, it was confirmed that the singer has recorded two songs for the soundtrack of the Marvel Studios film Black Panther: Wakanda Forever, the sequel to Black Panther (2018). In addition to "Lift Me Up", Rihanna recorded the track "Born Again". On October 26, Rihanna announced her first solo single release since "Love on the Brain" (2016), with "Lift Me Up", which would be appearing on Black Panther: Wakanda Forever – Music From and Inspired By, the soundtrack album to the eponymous 2022 film.

Composition 
According to Clash, "Lift Me Up" is an "emotive" R&B ballad that "speaks from the heart". Produced by Swedish composer Ludwig Göransson,  who composed the movie's score, the song acts as a tribute to the late Chadwick Boseman, who played T'Challa, the titular protagonist in Black Panther; Boseman died on August 28, 2020. The song was written by Rihanna, Göransson, Ryan Coogler and Tems. The latter spoke about the meaning and creative process of the song:
The song is performed in the key of A major with a tempo of 89 beats per minute in common time.  It follows a chord progression of A–Bm–E, and Rihanna's vocals span from G3 to E5 in the song.

Critical reception

Spencer Kornhaber of The Atlantic described the song as "gorgeous" and stated that it "is built around her vocals and reasserts her ownership of her now-ubiquitous sound." Harper's Bazaar Bianca Betancourt thought Rihanna might earn her first nomination of Best Original Song at the Academy Awards for "Lift Me Up".
Dylan Green of Pitchfork described the singer's voice as "matured, with a burnished, mahogany sheen" capable of keeping "the ballad afloat, selling every crescendo and note of anguish", however also described it as a "generic entry for the Black Panther: Wakanda Forever soundtrack". The Guardian Shaad D'Souza was not particularly impressed with the song's lyrical content, writing that it is "light and frankly anonymous, a far cry from Anti bright, world-weary, highly emotional lyrics" believing that it is not Rihanna's true comeback record. However, the journalist appreciated the production and sounds, describing them as "a soft, swaying ballad built around a lovely arpeggiating harp and serene strings", although "there is little of the heft and power of Tems songs such as 'Free Mind' or 'Damages'." Ed Potton of The Times rated the track 2 stars out of five, and wrote that even though it is "flawlessly sung over subtle strings by Rihanna", it is "forgettable" and "bland", adding that it "sounds like the result of a committee meeting — well meant, inoffensive, entirely devoid of individuality."

Accolades

Commercial performance 
In the United States, "Lift Me Up" debuted with nearly eight million streams, and 10,000 digital downloads on October 28, 2022, recording another 6.9 million streams and 6,000 digital downloads over the next two days, according to Luminate Data. The single ended up debuting at number two on the US Billboard Hot 100 chart, it garnered a 48.1 million radio audience, 26.2 million streams, and 23,000 digital downloads in its opening first week, and marked Rihanna's first top-10 entry since "Wild Thoughts" in 2017. "Lift Me Up" is Rihanna's 32nd top 10, as well as her highest debut, tied with the 2010 Eminem collaboration "Love the Way You Lie" which also entered the chart at number two. "Lift Me Up" further debuted at number three on the Digital Songs Sales chart—Rihanna's 36th top-ten song on the chart. Simultaneously, the song started at number six on the Radio Songs chart, becoming only the fourth top-ten debut since the chart's establishment in 1998. The single topped the Hot R&B/Hip-Hop Songs and Hot R&B Songs charts, marking Rihanna's eighth and sixth number-one songs on the charts, respectively.

In the United Kingdom, "Lift Me Up" debuted at number three on the Official Singles Chart, marking that week's highest entry on the chart. Simultaneously, it became Rihanna's first top-5 single in five years and her highest-placing solo single in the UK in a decade, following "Diamonds" (2012). Furthermore, it became Rihanna's 31st top-10 and 50th top-40 song in the UK. The song debuted at number three on the Irish Singles Chart as well. In Australia, "Lift Me Up" debuted at number five on the ARIA Singles Chart.

Promotion

Music video 
The song's music video was released on October 28, 2022, via Rihanna's official YouTube channel. The video is directed by Autumn Durald Arkapaw, the cinematographer of Black Panther: Wakanda Forever, and it depicts Rihanna on an empty beach interspersed with short scenes from the film.

Live performance 

Rihanna performed "Lift Me Up" for the first time during the 95th Academy Awards on March 12, 2023. The performance featured a full band, string section, and backup vocalists, while Rihanna was standing on a central platform that elevated in the middle of the rendition. Lyndsey Havens of Billboard called the performance "soaring" and wrote, "'Lift Me Up' came to life as Rih sang with palpable passion to honor the late Chadwick Boseman." According to Julia MacCary of Variety, many people watching the performance in the audience or at home "were struck by the power and emotiveness of her live vocals." The New York Times' Nicole Sperling declared the performance alongside Lady Gaga's the "Best Pop Superstar Performance" of the night. She stated, "The soaring ballad benefited from the deft stage design, and Rihanna’s vocals brought down the house."

Credits and personnel 
Credits adopted from Tidal.

 Robyn Fenty – vocal, lyricist, composer 
 Temilade Openiyi – lyricist, composer, background vocalist
 Ryan Coogler – lyricist, composer 
 Ludwig Göransson – producer, lyricist, composer, piano
 Mono Blanco – additional vocal
 Kuk Harrell – vocal producer
 Chris Gehringer – mastering engineer 
 Manny Marroquin – mixer 
 Marco Carriòn – recording engineer 
 Marcos Tovar – recording engineer 
 Osarumen "LMBSKN" Osamuyi – recording engineer 
 Oamen "SirBastien" – recording engineer 
 Irabor – recording engineer 
 Frank Rodriguez – recording engineer
 Trey Pearce – assisting, recording engineer 
 Robert N. Johnson – assisting, recording engineer 
 Patrick Gardner – assisting, recording engineer 
 Hayden Duncan – assisting, recording engineer 
 Lou Carrao – assisting, recording engineer

Charts

Weekly charts

Year-end charts

Certifications

Release history

References 

2022 singles
2022 songs
2020s ballads
Black Panther (film series)
Number-one singles in Switzerland
Rihanna songs
Songs written by Rihanna
Songs written by Ludwig Göransson
Songs written by Tems (singer)
Marvel Cinematic Universe songs
Contemporary R&B ballads
Pop ballads
Soul ballads
Roc Nation singles
Def Jam Recordings singles
Hollywood Records singles
Ultratop 50 Singles (Wallonia) number-one singles